The John Deere Model A is a row crop tractor manufactured by Deere & Company. The A was produced in a wide variety of versions for special-purpose cultivation. It received a styling upgrade in 1939 and electric starting in 1947. With the advent of John Deere's numerical model numbering system, the A became the John Deere 60, and later the 620 and 630, 3010, 3020, 4030, 4040, 4050, 4055, and ended with the 7610.

Description and production
The Model A was intended  to directly compete with McCormick's Farmall tractors. With over 320,000 sold by the end of its original production in 1952, it was a popular tractor that used Deere & Company's two cylinder design.

Early tractors burnt distillate, a petroleum byproduct similar to kerosene, which became a selling point owing to the fuel's low price. Deere & Company's two cylinder design strung from keeping costs low, and rather improve their current engine rather than develop a new engine. These engines made a very distinctive sound giving them the nickname "Johnny Poppers"

In 1938, the tractors received styled hood and grills, designed by Henry Dreyfuss. Tractors from 1939 to 1946 were known as "early styled", and tractors from 1947 to 1952 were termed "late styled." Pre-1939 tractors were termed "unstyled."

Variants on the A included the AO (for use in orchards), AI (for industrial use), AN (with a single front wheel), AW (with a wide front). The AN and AW further varied into models with high crop applications, the ANH and AWH, respectively. The AR was the non-row-crop version.

All were manufactured at the John Deere factory in Waterloo, Iowa, where 65,031 were built, selling for about $2,400.

John Deere 60
The A was succeeded with minimal changes by the John  Deere 60 in 1952 when Deere changed to using numbers instead of letters. The engine was upgraded for more power, and LP gas was a fuel option, as well as an optional 3-point hitch and a live power take-off. The 60 also had upgraded operation station as well as upgraded hydraulic system.  The 60 was the most popular tractor of its series.  In 1954 the 60 was equipped with power steering and updated rims, 52's and 53's had " window wheel rims."  Original price was $2,500 in 1956.  The 60 was replaced by the John Deere 620 in late 1956.  "Low-seat" 60s were equivalent to the AR, and "high-seat" 60s were the row-crop version. The Orchard 60 (O-60) was an additional variant for fruit growers, using the A powertrain. Only 530 "All-Fuel" O-60's were made, 285 gasoline O-60's, and only 45 LP Gas O-60's.

John Deere 620
The 60's replacement was the John Deere 620, in 1956. Engine power was increased again by reducing engine stroke by 0.375 inches, increasing the rpm. The Orchard 620 or O-620 used the new 620 engine and remained in production after the 630 was introduced. It was the only "20" series tractor in production after 1958.

John Deere 630

The John Deere 630 followed in 1958, with no mechanical changes. The only changes were more refined decal visuals, updated muffler, air intake, hood design, and dashboard. Production ended in 1960. The 630 was replaced by the four-cylinder John Deere 3010.

See also 
 John Deere B
 John Deere H
 John Deere G

References

External links
 Test 222: John Deere A at the Nebraska Tractor Test Laboratory (NTTL)
 Test 378: John Deere AR at the NTTL
 Test 384: John Deere A at the NTTL
 Test 429: John Deere AR at the NTTL
 Test 472: John Deere 60 Gas at the NTTL
 Test 490: John Deere Model 60 (All Fuel) at the NTTL
 Test 513: John Deere 60 LPG at the NTTL

John Deere tractors